Glen Rovers is a Cork-based Gaelic Athletic Association club based in Blackpool, Cork, Ireland. The club was founded in 1916 and is primarily concerned with the game of hurling. They were Cork senior hurling champions in 2015 and 2016, having won their first title in 26 years in 2015. They retained the championship in 2016, when they beat Erin's Own in the final. Only Blackrock have won more Cork senior hurling championships.

Hurling

Colours
In the early days of the club, its colours were green, white and gold. The Easter Rising and the execution of the leaders took place in the same year the Glen was founded. These events left such an impression on the minds of the Irish public that it was decided to add a black band to the jersey to honour the recently deceased patriots.  This distinctive and unique hooped jersey has been used ever since.

The Glen Rovers crest is also unique, and features a modernised Celtic cross with the image of the north side glen in the centre. The crest also features two crossed hurleys.

History

Beginnings
Hurling had been played in the Blackpool area for some time before the Glen Rovers club was established. Areas like the Commons Road and Thomas Davis Street in particular had fielded teams from time to time. In 1910, a hurling club honouring the Fenian leader Brian Dillon was established at Dillon's Cross. In 1915, the five-year-old club won the county minor hurling championship (minor was open to all ages back then) but due to World War I the winners’ medals were not presented.  The following year Dillon's lost to Lisgoold in the county junior hurling championship and controversy arose at this time because the 1915 minor medals had still not been presented. Some of those most affronted decided to leave Dillons and form a new club at the other side of "the Glen". The club, called Glen Rovers GAA, was established late in 1916 and affiliated the following year.  The new club was closely linked with the St. Nicholas' Gaelic Football Club which had been established 15 years earlier and was based in the same part of the city.

From its foundation, the Glen club competed at both minor and junior levels.  Success came relatively quickly and county minor titles were won in 1922 and 1923. A county junior title followed in 1924 and a county intermediate title was won in 1925.

Eight in-a-row
Glen Rovers first joined the senior ranks of the Cork County Championship in 1926.  The club contested its first county final in 1930, however, the side lost out to a star-studded Blackrock team. 1934 saw the Glen line out in their second county final with their south side rivals St. Finbarr's providing the opposition.  On that occasion history was made as Glen Rovers captured the county title for the first time with a 3–2 to 0–6 victory over one of the stalwart teams of the county.

In 1935 Glen Rovers made it back-to-back championship titles with a second consecutive county final win, this time over Carrigtwohill.

Title number three was gained at the expense of Sarsfields in 1936. "The Glen" reached the county final again in 1937, and they had a 3–5 to 1–0 victory over Carrigtwohill for the second time in three years.  1938 saw Midleton provide the opposition as Glen Rovers sought a record-breaking fifth county title in-a-row.  Once again the north side men had too much and Joe Lee led Cork to a 5–6 to 1–3 victory and a fifth consecutive county title.

In 1939 Jack Lynch took over as captain of the team, and the Glen contested their sixth county final in-a-row. However, in taking on Blackrock, Glen Rovers were facing their sternest test. The final was a contest between the new and the old and was billed as "the game of the century".  At half-time Blackrock led by a point, however, at the final whistle the Glen were the victors by 5–4 to 2–5.

1940 saw Jack Lynch lead out the Glen in the county final once again. Sarsfields provided the opposition on that occasion in a game remarkable for the scoring of 17 goals. Charlie Tobin captured six of those goals as the Glen won by 10–6 to 7–5.  It was the club's seventh county victory in-a-row and provided a swansong for Paddy ‘Fox’ Collins, the first of the Glen "greats", who retired from hurling following the victory.

The 1941 championship marked the last of the eight successes, representing an accomplishment that has never been equalled since.  The title was won with a 4–7 to 2–2 victory over Ballincollig.  This victory marked the retirement of many of the club stalwarts who had contributed so much to the record-breaking run.  The occasion was also noteworthy as it marked the arrival of the legendary Christy Ring as a new force with the Glen.

The honour of being the team to knock Glen Rovers off their perch fell to Ballincollig.  Jack Lynch was captain of the team again that year, however, the Glen were defeated in the county semi-final.

1940s–1960s

After a two-year hiatus the Glen were back in the county final in 1944.  Staunch south side rivals and reigning back-to-back champions St. Finbarr's provided the opposition on that occasion, however, a score line of 5–7 to 3–3 gave Glen Rovers a ninth county title.  In 1945 the Glen made it two in-a-row as divisional side Carrigdhoun fell by 4–10 to 5–3 in what Christy Ring remembers as one of the best county finals ever played.  The Glen’s hopes of making in three county championships in-a-row were thwarted in 1946 as ‘the Barr’s’ triumphed by just two points in that year’s county final.

In 1948 Glen Rovers contested the county decider once again in what was described as a game for the veterans.  Jack Lynch returned to the side for that game after a prolonged absence and played a key role at midfield.  The game was a tense affair as Christy Ring and a Blackrock player were both dismissed.  In spite of losing one of their key forwards the Glen still triumphed by 5–7 to 3–2.  This was the beginning of another great run of success for the club as they captured a second consecutive county title in 1949 with a thrilling 6–5 to 0–14 victory over divisional side Imokilly.  In 1950 only St. Finbarr's stood in Glen Rovers way of capturing a third county championship in-a-row.  At half-time the game still hung in the balance as the Barr's led by a point.  At full-time, however, the Glen had done enough to secure the victory with a 2–8 to 0–5 score line. This game was significant as it marked the end of Jack Lynch's club hurling career.  By the early 1950s it looked as if the Glen were going to dominate the county championship like they had done at the start of the 1940s.  A fourth consecutive county final victory beckoned in 1951 as Sarsfields provided the opposition.  While it looked as if the Glen's march couldn't be stopped that's exactly what happened as the east Cork team won the day by 5–8 to 3–7.

Even though Jack Lynch had retired at the start of the decade the new star at the club, Christy Ring, was helping the Glen to more successes throughout the 1950s.  After defeat in 1951 and a less than successful year in 1952 the Glen bounced back in 1953.  That year the northsiders lined out in the county final with near rivals Sarsfield's providing the opposition.  Another goal-fest ensued as the Glen won by 8–4 to 4–3.  The Glen remained at the top of the Cork hurling ladder in 1954 by reaching the county final again.  Blackrock were the opponents on that occasion, however, they provided little opposition as the Glen had an easy 7–7 to 3–2 victory.  It was their fifteenth county championship title.  The dominance of Glen Rovers didn't last long as they were beaten by St. Finbarr's in a replay of the county final in 1955 before being beaten by Blackrock in 1956.

Two years later in 1958 the Glen were back in the county championship decider.  Once again St. Finbarr's provided the opposition; however, the Glen won the day by 4–6 to 3–5. This victory kick-started another short period of domination for the Blackpool club as they successfully defended their title in 1959 with a six-point win over Blackrock.  Glen Rovers made it three in-a-row in 1960, however, not until after a stern test by UCC in the final.  A narrow 3–8 to 1–12 win allowed Glen Rovers to end the decade with a treble.  Four titles in-a-row proved beyond the Glen in 1961, however, the northsiders were back in the county final again in 1962.  Once again it was UCC who provided the opposition and, once again, the Glen found it difficult to defeat the collegians.  After a tough sixty minutes of hurling both sides finished level.  The replay was another close affair and at times it looked as if another draw was likely.  The Glen, however, rallied and secured a 3–8 to 2–10 victory.

Glen Rovers found it difficult to retain the title in 1963 and exited the championship before the final; however, the team was back in 1964 with great rivals St. Finbarr's providing the opposition.  It was a significant occasion in the history of the Glen Rovers club and a game that thrilled the 24,000 spectators.  Just before the interval the Barr's were leading by 0–6 to 0–4. When it looked as if the southsiders would also dominate the second half Glen captain Christy Ring swerved onto a pass from Joe Salmon and sent the sliothar into the net for a goal.  At full-time the Glen had powered forward to win by 3–12 to 2–7.  The game was significant as it was the Glen's twentieth championship title in thirty years.  Secondly, it also turned out to be Christy Ring's last victory on the field of play in a county final.  The game also marked the arrival on the scene of a new generation of Cork players, including Charlie McCarthy and Gerald McCarthy who lined out for St. Finbarr's.  The game was also significant as it allowed the Glen to represent Cork in the newly established Munster Senior Club Hurling Championship.  May people were sceptical of this competition, resulting in it being played over a long period of time.  The Munster club final of 1964, which featured the Glen and Mount Sion of Waterford, wasn't played until Easter Sunday 1966.  It was a noteworthy week in Irish history and for Glen Rovers.  Christy Ring's side won the final by 3–7 to 1–17 and many reporters considered it fitting that Glen Rovers, a club founded shortly after the 1916 Easter Rising and whose green, black and gold colours commemorate the event, should triumph on the fiftieth anniversary of that historic occasion.

1967 was another noteworthy year in the annals of Glen Rovers. Following a county championship quarter-final against UCC the legendary Christy Ring decided to hang up his hurley.  After a quarter of a century with the Glen, the team lined out in the county final without arguably the greatest player in the history of the game.  St. Finbarr’s were the opponents on that occasion; however, Glen Rovers triumphed by 3–9 to 1–9.  After a poor season in 1968 the Glen were back in the county championship decider.  For the third time that decade UCC stood between Glen Rovers and the county title.  In the end the men from Blackpool had an easy 4–16 to 1–13 victory over the collegians.

All-Ireland titles

The 1970s saw the arrival of Glen Rovers on the provincial and national stages.  1972 saw Denis Coughlan guide the club to their first county title of the decade with a 3–15 to 1–10 victory over east Cork side Youghal.  This victory allowed the club to represent Cork in the Munster Senior Club Hurling Championship.  The Glen subsequently reached the provincial decider where Tipperary champions Roscrea provided the opposition.  An exciting game developed between these two sides, however, the Glen were the eventual victors.  The two-point win gave the Glen a second Munster club title and the chance to represent the province in the All-Ireland Senior Club Hurling Championship series.  A 6–9 to 1–7 defeat of Castlegar allowed the Glen to advance to the All-Ireland final where St. Rynagh's provided the opposition.  The final at Croke Park was a tough affair, however, Tom Buckley and Red Crowley powered the Glen to a 2–18 to 2–8 victory. It was the Glen's first All-Ireland club title.

Glen Rovers lost their county, provincial and All-Ireland titles in 1974 before losing the 1975 county championship decider to Blackrock.  The Glen bounced back in 1976 with Martin O'Doherty leading the club to a 2–7 to 0–10 victory over ‘the Rockies.’  Once again this allowed the Glen to represent the county in the Munster club series.  The final pitted the Cork champs against Limerick side South Liberties.  After an entertaining hour of hurling the Glen emerged victorious by 2–8 to 2–4.  It was the club's third Munster title.  Facile wins in the All-Ireland quarter and semi-finals resulted in the Glen taking on Camross in the All-Ireland decider.  Nine survivors from the 1973 All-Ireland victory powered the Glen to a 2–12 to 0–8 win over the Laois champions who were inspired by the Cuddy family. It was their second All-Ireland club title.

Following such great success in the 1970s the Glen went into a remarkable decline.  The club lost a remarkable four county finals in five years in 1977, 1978, 1980 and 1981.  The Glen also contested the 1988 final which they also lost to ‘the Barr's.’  Glen Rovers atoned for this defeat in 1989 when Sarsfields fell in the county final by 4–15 to 3–13.  It was the Glen's twenty-fifth county championship title and the last time that the club won the county title.

A nine-point defeat by Midleton in 1991 was the last time until 2010 that Glen Rovers contested a county championship decider.

Camogie
Glen Rovers camogie club is the fourth most successful club in the history of the All-Ireland Senior Club Camogie Championship with a total of four victories in 1986, 1990, 1992 and 1993. They won further Munster club titles in 1964, 1967, 1987, 1991, 1994 and 1996.

Honours

All-Ireland Senior Club Hurling Championships:  2
 1973, 1977
Munster Senior Club Hurling Championships:  3
 1964, 1973, 1977
Cork Senior Hurling Championships:  27
 1934, 1935, 1936, 1937, 1938, 1939, 1940, 1941, 1944, 1945, 1948, 1949, 1950, 1953, 1954, 1958, 1959, 1960, 1962, 1964, 1967, 1969, 1972, 1976, 1989, 2015, 2016
Cork Intermediate Hurling Championships:  6
 1954, 1956, 1957, 1958, 1961, 1965
Cork Junior Hurling Championships:  2
 1924, 1950
Cork Under-21 Hurling Championships: 5
 1974, 1984, 1995, 2001, 2008
Cork Minor Hurling Championships:  27
 1922, 1923, 1926, 1933, 1934, 1936, 1937, 1945, 1946, 1950, 1951, 1952, 1956, 1958, 1959, 1964, 1971, 1972, 1973, 1976, 1979, 1985, 2002, 2005, 2006, 2017, 2021

Notable hurlers

This is a list of Glen Rovers hurlers who have played championship hurling for the Cork senior team.

Notable teams

Records and statistics

Top scorers

By year

See also
 Blackrock–Glen Rovers hurling rivalry
 Glen Rovers–St Finbarr's hurling rivalry

References

External links
Glen Rovers GAA site
Cork GAA site

 
Gaelic games clubs in County Cork
Hurling clubs in County Cork